The long-fingered triok (Dactylopsila palpator) is a species of marsupial in the family Petauridae. It is found in West Papua, Indonesia and Papua New Guinea.

It is known as blc in the Kalam language of Papua New Guinea.

References

Possums
Marsupials of New Guinea
Mammals of Papua New Guinea
Mammals of Western New Guinea
Least concern biota of Oceania
Mammals described in 1888
Taxonomy articles created by Polbot
Taxobox binomials not recognized by IUCN